Chorus UK (styled Chorus Choirs) is a large professional choir performing with the community and based in Sheffield, Leeds, Manchester, Liverpool, and Birmingham, England. The choir is managed by Andy Booth Presents, formerly Fono Productions, and the Musical Director is Andy Booth.

The choir performs various concerts as well as paid professional work, and is formed predominantly from singers without professional musical experience, and has grown from 50 to over 500 members. New members are recruited through regular 'come and try singing' workshops. With the ethos that 'anyone can sing' the choir welcomes all members and does not require auditions.

The choir sings a variety of popular music, from Broadway, pop, and rock. Across a term of 12 weeks, the choir prepares for a large concert at various venues including Sheffield City Hall, Royal Northern College of Music, and Leeds Town Hall. The concerts are often supported by the Sheffield Pops Orchestra and have featured guest soloists such as Lance Ellington and Jonathan Ansell.

Chorus expanded in to Manchester in April 2016 and then in to Leeds shortly after, with new branches opening in Birmingham, Nottingham, and Chesterfield opening in 2017, and Liverpool in 2019. Members of the choir supported Russell Watson on his 'Songs from the Heart' tour in July 2016. The choir was also invited to re-record a song with James Toseland and his band, Toseland, to be the anthem of the 2017 Special Olympics.

Concerts 

The choir have now held many large scale concerts, with a variety of other performances for charity as well as paid work for television.

International appearances

 In June 2016 ChorusUK were invited to sing in Amsterdam to celebrate the Netherlands presidency of the EU, performing at the Noorderkerk as well as at Leiden Shopping Centre and on the seafront at Scheveningen.
 In June 2017 ChorusUK performed a number of traditional a cappella songs at Notre Dame Cathedral, as well as a more lively lineup at Disneyland Paris
 In November 2018 ChorusUK performed again at Disneyland Paris as part of Disney's Enchanted Christmas 
 In November 2018 the choir also performed at Walt Disney World at part of the Christmas Parade

Professional Work

 ChorusUK performed on the David Walliams TV movie Billionaire Boy in 2016
 At Christmas 2019 the choir recorded and performed several songs with Aled Jones for Celebrity Carols at Christmas

References

External links
 

Yorkshire choirs
Musical groups from Sheffield
Musical groups from Leeds
Musical groups from Manchester
Musical groups from Liverpool